Gerry Hunt (born 1936) was an Irish cartoonist. He worked as an architect for 25 years, including 18 years at IDA Ireland. In 1986 he turned to cartooning, first drawing political cartoons, then creating a Spanish-language comic which he gave away to friends. In 2003 he created a short series of inner-city Dublin fables told in rhyme, In Dublin City, published by Atomic Diner. He then founded Dublin Comics, which published his crime graphic novel, Streets of Dublin, coloured by BrenB, c. 2005, and a collected edition of In Dublin City, also coloured by BrenB, c. 2007.

In 2009 he created Blood Upon the Rose, a graphic novel retelling the events of the Easter Rising of 1916, again coloured by BrenB, published by O'Brien Press. He is working on the forthcoming Draugr in Dublin City, about a dead Viking reawakened in modern Dublin.

References

Irish cartoonists
Irish comics writers
Irish comics artists
Living people
1936 births